Venusia obliquisigna is a moth in the family Geometridae first described by Frederic Moore in 1888. It is found in India, Nepal and China.

References

Moths described in 1888
Venusia (moth)